Svenevik is a village in Lyngdal municipality in Agder county, Norway. The small village of Skomrak is located about  straight east across the fjord.

References

Villages in Agder
Lyngdal
North Sea